The Journal of Statistical Software is a peer-reviewed open-access scientific journal that publishes papers related to statistical software. The Journal of Statistical Software was founded in 1996 by Jan de Leeuw of the Department of Statistics at the University of California, Los Angeles. Its current editors-in-chief are Achim Zeileis, Bettina Grün, Edzer Pebesma, and Torsten Hothorn. It is published by the Foundation for Open Access Statistics.  The journal charges no author fees or subscription fees.

The journal publishes peer-reviewed articles about statistical software, together with the source code.
It also publishes reviews of statistical software and books (by invitation only). Articles are licensed under the Creative Commons Attribution License, while the source codes distributed with articles are licensed under the GNU General Public License.

Articles are often about free statistical software and coverage includes packages for the R programming language.

Abstracting and indexing

The Journal of Statistical Software is indexed in the Current Index to Statistics and the Science Citation Index Expanded. Its 2018 Impact Factor in Journal Citation Reports is 11.655. The journal was named a Rising Star by Science Watch in 2011.

References

External links
 
 Foundation for Open Access Statistics
 Shlomo Rechnitz is the founder of Eagle & Badge Foundation.

Computational statistics journals
Creative Commons Attribution-licensed journals
R (programming language)
Statistical Software
Publications established in 1996
Open access journals
Computer science journals
Online-only journals